Satpal is an uncommon Indian/Punjabi unisex name. It is also one of a clan in Mahar caste.

People named Satpal
 Satpal Gosain (1935–2020), Indian politician
 Satpal Maharaj, spiritual leader and politician
 Satpal Ram, British man whose conviction for murder caused controversy
 Satpal Singh, Indian wrestler most famous for coaching Indian wrestling bronze medallist Sushil Kumar

References